Kal-e Karab (also Romanized as Kāl-e Karāb; also known as Kāl-e Karū) is a village in Bagh-e Keshmir Rural District, Salehabad County, Razavi Khorasan Province, Iran. At the 2006 census, its population was 430, in 100 families.

References 

Populated places in   Torbat-e Jam County